Bocula inconclusa is a moth of the family Erebidae first described by Francis Walker in 1862. It is found in Borneo and Myanmar.

References

Rivulinae